Morris Glenn Martin (January 19, 1906 – April 17, 1997), also known as Abe Martin, was an American football player, coach of football, basketball and baseball, and college athletics administrator. He was the fifth head football coach at the Southern Illinois University Carbondale (SIU), serving from 1939 to 1949 and compiling a record of 31–42–5.  Martin was the school's head basketball coach from  1943 to 1946, tallying a mark of 43–20, head baseball coach from 1947 to 1965, amassing a record of 281–156–2.  He was also the athletic director from 1945 to 1953.

On April 30, 1972, Southern Illinois' baseball field was dedicated in honor of Martin, who retired from the athletic department in 1971. The field was later renamed in honor of a different coach in 2014.

Coaching career
Martin began his coaching career in 1933 at Fairfield High School in Fairfield, Illinois. He moved to Pontiac High School in Pontiac, Illinois in 1936 and then to Princeton High School in Princeton, Illinois a year later. He was hired at Southern Illinois Normal University—now known as Southern Illinois University Carbondale—as an assistant football coach in 1938. Martin succeeded William McAndrew as head football coach at Southern Illinois in 1939.

Death
Martin died on April 17, 1997, at a retirement home Springfield, Illinois.

Head coaching record

College football

References

External links
 
 

1906 births
1997 deaths
Chicago Cardinals players
Southern Illinois Salukis athletic directors
Southern Illinois Salukis baseball coaches
Southern Illinois Salukis football coaches
Southern Illinois Salukis football players
Southern Illinois Salukis men's basketball coaches
High school basketball coaches in Illinois
High school football coaches in Illinois
People from White County, Illinois
Coaches of American football from Illinois
Players of American football from Illinois
Baseball coaches from Illinois
Basketball coaches from Illinois